The  Fanti saw-wing (Psalidoprocne obscura), also known as the Fanti rough-winged swallow, is a small passerine bird in the swallow family. The Fanti saw-wing has often described as the most beautiful of the swallows, owing to its uniformly shimmering green plumage.

Description
This is a small swallow at 17 cm. Its plumage is glossy green. The tail is long and deeply forked. Sexes are similar, but the female has a shorter tail. Juveniles are brown with little gloss, and have short tails.

Distribution and habitat
The Fanti saw-wing breeds in the lowlands of southern west Africa from Senegal to Cameroon. It is mainly resident, apart from seasonal movements. This bird is found in open country, including light woodland, near water. 

Fanti saw-wings are graceful flyers and they generally feed on insects, including beetles, while airborne. They are typically seen low over water or grassland.

The lined nests are built in a 60 cm burrow in a vertical bank. The clutch is two eggs.

References

 Birds of The Gambia by Barlow, Wacher and Disley, 
 Swallows and Martins by Turner and Rose 

Fanti saw-wing
Birds of West Africa
Fanti saw-wing